Ballybeg is an anglicisation of the Irish language term, Baile Beag, which means "Little Town". Ballybeg is the name of a number of small townlands and villages in Ireland, including:

Villages and townlands
 Ballybeg, County Antrim, a townland in County Antrim, Northern Ireland
 Ballybeg, a townland in County Carlow, Ireland
 Ballybeg in Clarecastle, County Clare, Ireland
 Ballybeg Priory near Buttevant, County Cork, Ireland
 Ballybeg, a townland in County Down, Northern Ireland
 Ballybeg, a townland in County Laois, Ireland
 Ballybeg, a townland near Strokestown, County Roscommon, Ireland
 Ballybeg, County Tipperary, a townland in County Tipperary
 Ballybeg, County Tyrone, a townland in County Tyrone, Northern Ireland
 Ballybeg, County Waterford, a suburb of Waterford, Ireland
 Ballybeg, Faughalstown, a townland in Faughalstown civil parish, barony of Fore, County Westmeath, Republic of Ireland
 Ballybeg, Kilcumreragh, a townland in Kilcumreragh civil parish, barony of Moycashel, County Westmeath, Republic of Ireland 
 Ballybeg, a village in County Wicklow, Ireland

Fictional places
 Ballybeg (fictional town), the fictional County Donegal town in which Irish playwright Brian Friel set works such as Philadelphia Here I Come! and Dancing at Lughnasa